Robin Fisher may refer to:

 Robin Fisher (historian)
 Robin Fisher (cricketer)